Tony Stark has worn different versions of the Iron Man armor throughout the Marvel Cinematic Universe (MCU). He has also built armor for James Rhodes (which became the War Machine armor), the Iron Spider suit for Peter Parker, and Pepper Potts' Rescue armor.

In Iron Man (2008), physical armor was built by Stan Winston Studios, with the digital version and other visual effects done by Industrial Light & Magic. Further appearances of the armor in the MCU were mainly created through visual effects. Iron Man comic book artist Adi Granov designed the Mark III, with further armors also being inspired by the armors from the comics.

Design and creation

Iron Man (2008) director Jon Favreau wanted the film to be believable by showing the eventual construction of the Mark III suit in its three stages. Stan Winston and his company were hired to build metal and rubber versions of the armors. The Mark I design was intended to look like it was built from spare parts: particularly, the back is less armored than the front, as Tony Stark would use his resources to make a forward attack. It also foreshadows the design of Obadiah Stane's Iron Monger armor. A single  version was built and was designed to only have its top half worn at times. The animatronic required five operators for the arm, and was built on a gimbal to simulate walking. A scale model was used for the shots of it being made. The Mark II resembles an airplane prototype with visible flaps.

Iron Man comic book artist Adi Granov designed the Mark III with illustrator Phil Saunders. Granov's designs were the primary inspiration for the film's, and he came on board the film after he recognized his work on Jon Favreau's MySpace page. Saunders streamlined Granov's concept art, making it stealthier and less cartoonish in its proportions, and also designed the War Machine armor, but it was "cut from the script about halfway through pre-production." He explained that the War Machine armor "was going to be called the Mark IV armor and would have had weaponized swap-out parts that would be worn over the original Mark III armor," and that it "would have been worn by Tony Stark in the final battle sequence." Concerned with the transition between the computer-generated and practical costumes, Favreau hired Industrial Light & Magic (ILM) to create the bulk of the visual effects for the film after seeing Pirates of the Caribbean: At World's End (2007) and Transformers (2007). The Orphanage and The Embassy did additional work. To help with animating the more refined suits, information was sometimes captured by having Downey wear only the helmet, sleeves and chest of the costume over a motion capture suit.

For Iron Man 2 (2010), ILM again did the majority of the effects, as it did on the first film. ILM's visual effects supervisor on the film, Ben Snow, said their work on the film was "harder" than their work on the first, stating that Favreau asked more of them this time around. Snow described the process of digitally creating the suits:

Because of how form-fitting the Mark V suitcase suit was required to be, the production team researched some of the classic comics armors, since they were seen as essentially variations on muscle suits. One specific aspect of an earlier armor was the color scheme from the Silver Centurion armor. The Mark VI armor was designed by Granov and Saunders to be sleeker than the Mark III, while retaining many of the Mark III’s qualities.

For The Avengers (2012), Saunders stated that "director Joss Whedon was looking for something that had the 'cool' factor of the suitcase suit" from Iron Man 2, but would be tough enough to survive the alien army from the film's climax. Saunders reworked concepts from the first two films into the Mark VII, a design with "big ammo packets on the arms and a backpack". The chest piece, which had been triangular in the Mark VI, was changed back to the classic circular shape of the Mark III. Weta Digital also took over duties for animating Iron Man during the forest duel from ILM. Guy Williams, Weta's visual effects supervisor, said, "We shared assets back and forth with ILM, but our pipelines are unique and it's hard for other assets to plug into it. But in this case, we got their models and we had to redo the texture spaces because the way we texture maps is different." Williams said the most difficult part was re-creating Iron Man's reflective metal surfaces.

For Iron Man 3 (2013), Chris Townsend served as visual effects supervisor.  The film featured over 2,000 visual effects shots and was worked on by 17 studios: Weta Digital, Digital Domain, Scanline VFX, Trixter, Framestore, Luma Pictures, Fuel VFX, Cantina Creative, Cinesite, The Embassy Visual Effects, Lola, Capital T, Prologue, and Rise FX. Digital Domain, Scanline VFX, and Trixter each worked on separate shots featuring the Mark XLII armor, working with different digital models. The studios shared some of their files to ensure consistency between the shots. For the Mark XLII and Iron Patriot armors, Legacy Effects constructed partial suits that were worn on set. Townsend explained that "Invariably we'd shoot a soft-suit with Robert [Downey Jr.] then we'd also put tracking markers on his trousers. He would also wear lifts in his shoes or be up in a box so he'd be the correct height – Iron Man is 6'5".

The art department at Marvel worked closely with a team from Digital Domain, which created realistically-proportioned 3D versions of suits, including textures and lighting, from Marvel's 2D concept art. Those models were then used by Marvel and Weta Digital. The heads-up display features of the helmet were inspired by visualization techniques from MRI diagnostic pattern recognition and graph theory, particularly by the connectogram, a circular graph that maps all of the white-matter connections of the human brain.

Concept art released in March 2014 for Avengers: Age of Ultron (2015), revealed the inclusion of a "Hulkbuster"–like armor. Iron Man's armor in Spider-Man: Homecoming (2017), the Mark XLVII, is a recolored version of the Mark XLVI armor introduced in Captain America: Civil War (2016); this was done because Sony Pictures did not have the budget to create a new Iron Man suit. Feige requested the color scheme resemble the Ultimate Iron Man armor from the comics. For Avengers: Infinity War (2018), visual effects vendor Framestore created Iron Man's Mark 50 suit, based on the Bleeding Edge armor from the comics, which is made up of singular nanobots which move around his body to form a suit, and was developed alongside Marvel for about two years.

List of armors

Main armor

Iron Legion
These armors were created before the beginning of Iron Man 3 by Stark, where they were introduced, to help in different types of situations he might encounter. They are first referenced to as the "Iron Legion" in Iron Man 3 Prelude #2 (April 2013). The first Iron Legion is a set of specialized armors built for various situations that he might encounter such. Built due to his insomnia, he eventually destroys them due to the friction they cause between him and Pepper Potts. They appeared in Iron Man 3 and consisted of armors Mark VIII through Mark XLI. The second Iron Legion is a set of drones built by Tony Stark in order to aid the Avengers. However, after the creation of the AI Ultron, it builds itself a body from a destroyed drone, and takes control of the rest.

Hulkbuster armor

Related armors

War Machine armor

Non-Iron Man armors

Avengers Campus
Avengers Campus has an exclusive Iron Man armor for Disney Parks, known as the Mark 80.

References

External links
 
 A Guide on Every Armor Worn by Iron Man in the MCU on Marvel.com
 Iron Man's Armor Evolution video, from Disney+

Fictional armour
Iron Man (film series)
Iron Man in other media
Marvel Cinematic Universe features
Marvel Comics weapons
Nanotechnology in fiction
Drones in fiction
Fictional elements introduced in 2008